A whirligig is an object that spins or whirls, or has whirling parts, also found at:
Buzzer (whirligig)

Whirligig may also refer to:
 
Whirligig (torture), a medieval torture device
Whirl-Y-Gig, a dance club in London
Whirligig beetle, a family of water beetles
Whirlygig, a film by Chaz Thorne
Samara (fruit) or whirligig, a tree fruit with a papery winglike appendage
Whirligig (novel), a young-adult novel by Paul Fleischman
Whirligigs, book of stories by O. Henry (1910), including the short story The Whirligig of Life
Whirligig (TV series), BBC television programme for children broadcast 1950–56

Music
Whirligig (album), a 1995 album by the rock band The Caulfields
Whirlygig (album), a 1997 album by the rock band Lovemongers
Whirligig, a piano piece by Arnold Bax